Henry Phillips is a Panamanian weightlifter. He competed in the men's heavyweight event at the 1972 Summer Olympics.

References

Year of birth missing (living people)
Living people
Panamanian male weightlifters
Olympic weightlifters of Panama
Weightlifters at the 1972 Summer Olympics
Place of birth missing (living people)